Haerlempjes refer to a specific genre of landscape painting that includes a view of Haarlem (formerly spelled Haerlem). It is used most often to refer to Jacob van Ruisdael's panoramic views of the city, but the term is derived from mentions in Haarlem archives as a type of painting included in household inventories. The diminutive suffix "pje" would denote a small, cabinet-sized painting, but even the largest landscapes may be referred to as Haerlempjes today.

Background

In his biography of Albert van Ouwater, Karel van Mander claimed that It is said from the mouths of the oldest painters, that landscape painting originated in Haarlem. Van Mander was writing in 1604 for his Haarlem-sponsored Schilder-boeck, and his was one of many initiatives to rebuild the city and glorify its history. After his book was published, the city attracted several landscape painters in the 1620s, including Esaias van de Velde, Jan van Goyen and the Ruisdael brothers Salomon and Isaack.

Haarlem is a bustling city today that makes up part of the Randstad area of the Netherlands, so it helps when looking at these old paintings to orient oneself according to old maps.

Hobbyists love to look at older Haarlem cityscapes and pick out features such as steeples and boats. For paintings traditionally called Haerlempjes, such features have been proven to be based more on historical accuracy rather than artist fantasy.  Though fantasy cityscapes were popular in the Netherlands throughout the 17th-century, these seem to be more often pastiches of southern harbours or italianate landscapes, rather than places that artists had conceivably visited. Today, for example, it is assumed that Jacob van Ruisdael worked in Bentheim because he painted many accurate views of the castle there. However, he often painted such castle views situated in a fantasy landscape on a mountain top, though the castle is in fact situated in low rolling countryside. In Haarlem, though he painted many dunescapes of the Kennemerland area, he never turned those dunes into mountains.

Early views of Haerlem
Most travellers visiting Haarlem in the middle of the 17th-century were on their way from The Hague to Amsterdam and saw the city from the Spaarne river, as most intercity travel was by trekschuit or sailing ship. Thus many early cityscapes are taken from the point of view of the river traveller.

Dunescapes

The popularity of such river-based cityscapes were offset by another type of landscape with dunes or windmills that included a Haarlem cityscape on the horizon.

Panoramas of Haerlem

It wasn't until the 1650s that the production of the panoramic views began that were later copied by others. Perhaps the most famous is Ruisdael's view of Haarlem bleaching fields from the north-east, which is why many assumed that all Haerlempjes were painted from the same perspective, not realizing that the entire area is relatively flat and so they were painted from an imaginary point somewhere up in the air, and not from a mountaintop. There is a high dune in Bloemendaal called Het Kopje and there used to be a ridge of high dunes in Heemstede that were later slowly removed by sand-barges for use in building foundations for the mansions in the Amsterdam expansion known today as the Canals of Amsterdam. On older maps, the Sant-vaert is clearly marked where such barges once travelled. That canal still exists today and forms the modern border between Haarlem and Heemstede, and is called the Crayenestervaart.

In 1997 Pieter Biesboer wrote a short article explaining the viewpoints of some of these paintings based on old maps, most notably the Bleaching Fields to the North-Northeast of Haarlem in the collection of the Philadelphia Museum of Art. This painting, despite its title, does not show Haarlem from the north at all, but shows Haarlem from the south, from an imaginary point somewhere above the old dune ridge near the street known as the Blekersvaart in Heemstede, probably close to the Dorstige Kuil, an inn favored by artists in the 17th century. The church in the painting clearly shows the curved side of the choir on the right rather than the left. Biesboer noticed also that this painting displays many more trees, which is logical because the park Haarlemmerhout is situated there.

In the same article a few other paintings are mentioned, including a Ruisdael view of Haarlem bleaching fields in the collection of the Montreal Museum of Fine Arts, which shows the ruins of Huis ter Kleef, also shown from the same perspective in a painting in the musée Jacquemart-André. He was able to trace the bleachery Clercq and Beeck situated on the Kleverlaan shown in the right foreground in this painting to one owned by Lucas de Clercq, whose portrait was painted by Frans Hals. This scene of Clercq and Beeck was painted again by Ruisdael with some more detail in the version located in the Mauritshuis.

The painting from the Mauritshuis is the same view of Beeck and Clercq as the painting in the Rijksmuseum, while the one in the Gemäldegalerie of the same general view seems between those and the one in Montreal:

The painting from the Philadelphia Museum is the same view from Heemstede as the painting in the Timken Museum of Art:

Though not all of these panoramic paintings show bleachfields, these bleacheries were often also mentioned on maps, and served as easy points of orientation for those looking down on the landscape from high dunes. Possibly some of these paintings were commissioned by the bleacheries themselves for use in Haarlem shops where goods were sold and exchanged. Lucas de Clercq lived in Haarlem during the winter and on his Clercq and Beeck estate in the summer months. Even Rembrandt made a sketch of bleaching fields, though these were only identified as such a few centuries after the fact.

The Haerlempjes seemed to become popular not only in Haarlem, but were sold everywhere, and even various books were produced containing prints of such views of Haarlem by the Roghman family and others.

References

Haerlempjes met bleekvelden Website explaining the bleacheries in Haerlempjes
instructional video showing the viewpoints for many of these paintings
 Deugd boven geweld, Een geschiedenis van Haarlem, 1245-1995, edited by Gineke van der Ree-Scholtens, 1995, 

History of Haarlem
Jacob van Ruisdael
Visual arts genres